Hanthawaddy United Football Club is a Burmese football club, based in Taungoo, Myanmar. It represents the Bago Region. The club was a founding member of the Myanmar National League (MNL) in 2009.

Sponsorship

Club

Coaching staff
{|class="wikitable"
|-
!Position
!Staff
|-
|Manager|| U Ngwe Tun
|-
|rowspan="3"|Assistant Manager||
|-
|
|-
|
|-
|Goalkeeper Coach|| 
|-
|Fitness Coach|| 
|-
|Youth Team Head Coach||  
|-

Other information

|-

General Aung San Shield

Current squad (2015)
The management has assembled a team consisted mostly of young players. Goalkeeper Ko Ko Aung, part of the current Myanmar national football team roster, is the only local player with notable experience in the team.

Players

References
HU FC

External links
Pages
Fan pages

Hanthawaddy United